Kenneth Henry Davies (born 8 July 1948) is an Australian politician who represented the seats of Townsville and Mundingburra in the Queensland Legislative Assembly for the Labor Party. First elected in 1989, he was the head of the Parliamentary Criminal Justice Commission, and then was promoted to cabinet, in a junior ministerial role in Emergency Services and Consumer Affairs. A close race in the 1995 state election resulted in him winning by just 16 votes. The result was overturned by the Court of Disputed Returns on 8 December 1995, and Davies, running as an Independent after being disendorsed by the ALP, lost in the subsequent by-election.

From 1998 to 2005 he served as general manager of the Kyogle Council in northern New South Wales. but was dismissed from the role after being criticised for living in Brisbane and commuting to Kyogle.

References 

1948 births
Living people
Members of the Queensland Legislative Assembly
Australian Labor Party members of the Parliament of Queensland